Ozoz Sokoh (born June 30, 1976) is a Nigerian culinary writer. She is known as the Kitchen Butterfly.

Early life and education
Born in Warri, on the southern coast of Nigeria, Ozoz’ journey with food started with an unlikely Wimpy's kid meal of hamburger, chips and Mirinda during a family trip to the Edinburgh Summer Festival in August of ‘85.
 
She attended the Obafemi Awolowo University, Ile-Ife, Nigeria for 3 years, and left in 1997, because of the long industrial actions that plagued - and continue to plague - Nigerian universities at the time. She moved to the United Kingdom where she earned a degree in Geology (B.Sc. Hons)  from the University of Liverpool. During her time in the UK, she began cooking Nigerian food to feel closer to home. She was inspired by her dad, who loved cooking and made everything from scratch.

Career 
After graduating from the University of Liverpool, she worked as an Exploration Geoscientist and a Business Adviser within Business and Government Relations. In addition to her day job, Ozoz began explorations of Nigerian food, which grew while she lived and worked in the Netherlands from 2007 to 2011.
 
She founded Kitchen Butterfly during this period. There, she documents culinary history, recipes, techniques and more. She describes a chance encounter of a familiar food during a Queen’s Day celebration in The Netherlands as a defining moment, one that strengthened her resolve to research and document food history and commonalities/ connectedness across cultures. Another was her discovery that when enslaved people were taken to Brazil during the trans-Atlantic slave trade, one of the many parts of their culture they took with them and preserved was Acaraje, a popular black-eyed bean fritter known as akara in Nigeria.
 
Since 2007, she has created multi-media expressions of her work, on the premise that ‘Food is more than eating’. A food explorer who examines the intersection of Nigerian food and history, migration, agriculture, and politics, some of her key areas of work are:

New Nigerian Kitchen 
Created by Sokoh in 2013, the New Nigerian Kitchen is a culinary philosophy and practice that celebrates the fresh and vibrant flavours of Nigerian cuisine. Upon her return to Nigeria in 2011, she began researching how familiar Nigerian ingredients could be understood by exploring and documenting their uses in a variety of ways to understand the possibilities and create dishes — from the traditional to the experimental and contemporary. She takes a scientific approach of exploring flavour profiles and textures to ensure the New Nigerian Kitchen redefines and broadens the perspectives of Nigerian cuisine and, invariably, West African cuisine.

Culinary Anthropology 
Another aspect of her work is culinary anthropology. While often deriving roots in Nigerian foods, her work extends beyond the country and continental dishes to explore history and interconnectedness. Her research in this area has been the subject of articles, documentaries, podcasts, talks and exhibitions including her 2014 TEDx Port Harcourt talk titled Journey by Plate: Reimagining Nigerian Cuisine. Another is the documentary on the origins of Agege Bread, a staple in Nigeria, which she researched and presented on ‘For Africans’.
 
Sokoh uses research and documentation to tell the stories of Nigerian culture and history and create awareness of Nigerian cuisine at home and abroad.

Practice 
Sokoh's culinary practice encompasses creating resources, recipes and concepts. On another site, Feast Afrique, she documents the culinary heritage and knowledge of West Africa and its diaspora. This body of work includes a digital library of 240+ West African and Diasporic culinary and literary resources that bridges access gaps in knowledge.

Recipes and Guides: Sokoh has authored recipes published in blogs, articles, journals, and books. In 2017, she developed Nigeria's first seasonal produce calendar detailing Nigerian fruits and vegetables and their seasonal availability. She also created guides to tastes and flavours of Nigerian cuisine.
 
Concepts: She creates experiential concepts, including the first World Jollof Rice Day Festival set up in 2017. The festival is held to celebrate a dish that is unarguably Nigeria's favourite food—and its most popular worldwide. Another is ‘Eat The Book’, a concept that celebrates African food from African writing and sees Sokoh bring meals alive from novels so that attendees at literary and arts festivals can experience them. ‘Eat the Book’ has featured at festivals including the 2018 Ake Festival; the 2018 Eat Drink Food Festival; and the 2019 Afrolution Festival, Berlin. She is the co-organiser of Abori Food System Design Summit. Held at Alliance Française, Lagos in 2019, the summit featured food exhibitions, discussions and a farmer's market.

Awards and nominations 
2020 - Forecast mentee

2018 - Saveur Magazine's Readers’ Choice Award for Best Food & Culture Blog.

2018 – Eloy Awards Chef of the Year Nominee

2017 – Eloy Awards Female Chef or Food Designer Nominee

2017 – Leading Ladies Africa List of 100 Most Inspiring Women in Nigeria

2011 – Women in Energy Recognition Award

2010 - July Winner of Food52's Swordfish contest

Media Features 
Her work has been featured on media platforms including CNN International's African Voices; Channels Television; and CGTN where she explained that her work with Nigerian cuisine aims to change what Nigerians eat at home and what is served in Nigerian restaurants across the globe.

Other Interests 
Ozoz is a photographer whose work has been featured in exhibitions including Standing Out II (2017). Her first solo exhibition, ‘Postcards From Lagos (2015), was a collection of urban stills, streetscapes and silhouettes that paid ode to the city of Lagos, Nigeria. She is also passionate about education and development. Since 2018, she has been a mentor with the women-focused creativity platform, ForCreativeGirls. She has facilitated workshops, including the Goethe Institut Nigeria's Food Crossroads Workshop in 2018, and a GTBank Food and Drink Masterclass in 2016.

References

External links 
 Official Website (Kitchen Butterfly)

Living people
1976 births
Nigerian women writers
Nigerian food writers
Nigerian cuisine
Culinary arts
Obafemi Awolowo University alumni
Alumni of the University of Liverpool
People from Warri